Anastasios Zarkadas (born 4 November 1994) is a Greek professional footballer who plays for AO Karavas.

Career
Zarkadas began his career with the youth club of Panetolikos F.C.  He signed his first professional contract in August 2014, but made no appearances with the first team.  He spent the second half of the 2014-2015 on loan to Fokikos F.C. making 8 appearances in the Greek Football League.

He made his Panetolikos debut on 29 November 2015, coming in as a substitute in the game against AEK.

References

External links
SuperLeague Profile

1994 births
Living people
Greek footballers
Panetolikos F.C. players
Association football midfielders